Pedanius Dioscorides was a Greek physician, pharmacologist, and botanist.

Dioscorides or Dioscurides may also refer to:

 Dioscurides (nephew of Antigonus I), admiral during the Wars of the Diadochi
 Dioscorides (Stoic), Stoic philosopher
 Dioscorides (poet) (3rd century BC), Hellenistic epigrammatist